Hernán López (born 5 July 1973) is an Argentine former cyclist. He competed in the individual pursuit at the 1992 Summer Olympics.

References

External links
 

1973 births
Living people
Argentine male cyclists
Olympic cyclists of Argentina
Cyclists at the 1992 Summer Olympics
Place of birth missing (living people)